Podcrkavlje is a municipality in Brod-Posavina County, Croatia. There are 2,553 inhabitants of which 98.8% declare themselves Croats (2011 census).

References
 

Municipalities of Croatia
Populated places in Brod-Posavina County